Jathedar Udham Singh Nagoke was a freedom fighter, Jathedar of Akal Takht and member of Rajya Sabha.

Jathedar of the Akal Takht
As Jathedar of the Akal Takht, he was scheduled to lead the first Shahidi Jatha (martyrs' column) on its way to the agitation at Jaito. However, the Government arrested him the night before (8 February 1924) and sentenced him to two confinement in the Central Jail at Multan. On his release in 1926, he was again appointed Jathedar of Akal Takht. By then the Sikh Gurdwaras Act, 1925 had been placed on the statute book. In the elections held under this Act, he was elected a member of the Shiromani Gurdwara Parbandhak Committee and continued to be elected or co-opted to it till 1954. During this time he was a member of the Darbar Sahib Committee from 1930 to 1933.  He was elected president of the Shiromani Committee in 1948 and again in 1950.

President of the Shiromani Akali Dal
He participated in the civil disobedience movement started by the Indian National Congress and served another year in custody. In 1935, he was elected president of the Shiromani Akali Dal. The freedom campaign claimed another four years of his life (1936-39. Another term in jail awaited him in March 1942 under the Defence of India Rules. In the Quit India Movement he suffered jail for three years.

Punjab Provincial Assembly
After his release at the end of the Second World War, Jathedar Nagoke was elected to the Punjab Provincial Assembly in 1946. In 1952 he was appointed head of the Bharat Sevak Samaj, a front organisation of the Congress Party.

Rajya Sabha
He was elected to the Rajya Sabha in 1952 as a Congress nominee, a position he held until 1960. He was also a member of the Punjab Pradesh Congress executive during this period.

Punjabi Suba agitation
In 1960 he joined C. Rajagopalachari's Swatantra Party and headed its Punjab Branch in 1960-61. In 1960's he joined the Punjabi Suba movement. He served a term in jail in 1960 in the Punjabi Suba agitation.

Death
He gave up this life at the Postgraduate Institute of Medical Sciences at Chandigarh on 11 January 1966.

References

1894 births
1966 deaths
Punjab, India politicians
Indian National Congress politicians from Punjab, India
Shiromani Akali Dal politicians
Swatantra Party politicians
Rajya Sabha members from Punjab, India